, (born Osaka, 15 June 1959) is a former Japanese rugby union player. He played as flanker. A former Japanese international, former  forwards coach of the Japanese national team and head coach for the Japanese U21 and U23 national teams. Kawase was also appointed as Japan selection coach, Japan A national team coach, head coach of the Japan students national team, as well as Kansai representative coach. Currently, he coaches Setsunan University RFC (inaugurated in 1986), which plays in the Kansai University Rugby Football Leagues' A League. He is also a teacher at Setsunan University.

Career
Hailing from Osaka Prefecture, after attending high school at the Osaka Institute of Technology and graduating from Meiji University. In the professional league, Kawase played his entire career for Toshiba Fuchu, as well for Osaka Teachers Rugby Football Team.

International career
Kawase had his first cap for Japan in 1982, against New Zealand Universities, at Pukekohe, on 30 May 1982. He was also part of the 1987 Rugby World Cup roster, where he played only the pool match against Australia at Sydney on 3 June 1987, which was his last cap for Japan.

References

External links
2019 ALL FOR JAPAN TEAM

1966 births
Living people
Japanese rugby union players
Rugby union flankers
Sportspeople from Osaka Prefecture
Rugby union coaches
Toshiba Brave Lupus Tokyo players
Japan international rugby union players